Sarsal is a village of Gujrat District, Punjab, Pakistan. It is frequently called Sarsala. It is approximately 38 km away from Gujrat City, near Koltla Arab Ali Khan, almost at the edge of Pakistan towards the border of Azad Kashmir. The total population of the village is 3,550 and the total number of houses is 578. Many of the residents moved to work abroad, especially in the United Arab Emirates, Saudi Arabia, Kuwait, Muscat (Oman), and European countries.

This village only has Chib Rajput and many families belong to Raja Shadi Shaheed or Raja Dharam Chib Chand. The Raja of the Katoch family and ruler of Bhimbher. All Rajputs are Dogra Rajput here and also Chandarvanshi Rajput. Notable Rajput of this village is Raja Sarfaraz Khan Chib and Raja Mirbaz Khan Chib Son of Raja Zulfiqar Khan Chib
Son of Raja Saleh Khan Chib.
Sarsal has several sports teams, including shooting volleyball, cricket, and jutki.

Postal Code : 50991

Populated places in Gujrat District